A10 new European architecture was an architectural magazine published in Amsterdam that relied on a network of correspondents throughout Europe. The magazine ran from 2004 to 2016. It often highlighted young practices and emphasized the establishment of connections between the various European nations.

History and profile
A10 – new European architecture was founded in 2004 by architecture critic Hans Ibelings and graphic designer Arjan Groot. The first issue appeared in November 2004. The magazine was published by Boom publishers Amsterdam BV on a bimonthly basis. It had its headquarters in Amsterdam. One of the editors-in-chief was Indira van 't Klooster.

References

External links
 

2004 establishments in the Netherlands
2016 disestablishments in the Netherlands
Architecture magazines
Bi-monthly magazines published in the Netherlands
Defunct magazines published in the Netherlands
Dutch-language magazines
Magazines established in 2004
Magazines disestablished in 2016
Magazines published in Amsterdam